Braulio Mario Guerra Urbiola (born March 28, 1972) is a Mexican politician. He serves as a member of the Chamber of Deputies, where he represents the state of Querétaro.

In March 2017, Guerra climbed the fence between Tijuana and San Diego, California to protest US President Donald Trump's campaign promise of building a wall.

His father is former President of the Queretaro Municipality and Dean of the Autonomous University of Querétaro, Braulio Guerra Malo.

On February 11, 2020, he gave a conference at the "Instituto Queretano Marista San Javier" High School (Querétaro) where he studied many years ago. As demonstrated in the conference, he shows difficulty spelling certain words in Spanish such as "obesity", which many students noted was spelled wrong during his presentation. This could be attributed to dyslexia, although there has been no confirmation of him having dyslexia.

References

External links

Living people
People from Querétaro
Mexico–United States barrier
Members of the Chamber of Deputies (Mexico) for Querétaro
Institutional Revolutionary Party politicians
1972 births
Autonomous University of Queretaro alumni